Farida Khanam (born 1952) is an Islamic scholar, speaker, author, translator, and peace activist. She spent more than two and half decades teaching Islamic Studies at Jamia Millia Islamia, New Delhi, India where she also earned her Master's and PhD. She is the current chairperson of CPS International. She is the daughter of the noted Islamic Scholar Maulana Wahiduddin Khan and has edited and translated his commentary of the Quran, Tazkirul Quran into English. Prof. Farida Khanam is the editor-in-chief and translator of many of Maulana Wahiduddin Khan's works.

Selected works

References 

Living people
1952 births
Indian Muslim scholars of Islam
20th-century Indian Muslims
21st-century Indian Muslims
Indian women scholars
Academic staff of Jamia Millia Islamia
Jamia Millia Islamia alumni
Translators of the Quran into English